John Quigley (born 1949) is a former Irish sportsperson.  He played hurling with his local club Rathnure and with the Wexford senior inter-county team in the 1960s and 1970s.

Playing career

Club
Quigley played his club hurling with the famous Rathnure club and enjoyed much success. He won his first county title in 1967 before winning a four-in-a-row in 1971, 1972, 1973 and 1974.  These wins were converted into Leinster club titles in 1971 and 1973.  Quigley won further county medals in 1977, 1979 and 1980.  He continued his club hurling well into the 1980s, winning both county and Leinster titles in 1986.

Inter-county
Quigley first came to prominence on the inter-county scene as a member of the Wexford minor hurling team in the 1960s.  He won both Leinster and All-Ireland honours at this level in 1966 and added a second Leinster minor medal to his collection in 1967.  Quigley later joined the county under-21 team where he won Leinster title in 1969.  By this stage he had already made his debut for the senior team.  Quigley won his first Leinster title in 1968, before lining out in Croke Park for the All-Ireland final.  Tipperary, Wexford's great rivals from that era, provided the opposition, however, Wexford ended up as the victorious team.  Quigley came on as a substitute in the game to win his first senior All-Ireland medal.  Wexford lost their provincial crown in 1969, however, Quigley won a second Leinster medal in 1970.  Unfortunately, his side were later beaten by Cork in a high-scoring All-Ireland final.  Kilkenny dominated the Leinster Championship for the next five years, however, Quigley won a National Hurling League medal in 1973.  In 1976 Wexford finally got the better of Kilkenny and Quigley won a third provincial title.  He later lined out in the All-Ireland final against Cork, however, in spite of being eight points up after as many minutes, Cork rallied to beat Wexford.  Quigley won a fourth Leinster medal in 1977, however, for the second year in-a-row Cork defeated Wexford in the All-Ireland final.

Province
Quigley also lined out with Leinster in the Railway Cup inter-provincial competition.  He won Railway Cup medals in 1971 and 1975.

References

1949 births
Living people
Rathnure hurlers
Wexford inter-county hurlers
Leinster inter-provincial hurlers
All-Ireland Senior Hurling Championship winners